Pedro Henrique de Oliveira Correia (born 5 May 1997), commonly known as Pedrão, is a Brazilian footballer who plays for Portuguese club Portimonense. Mainly a central defender, he can also play as a defensive midfielder.

Club career
Born in São Paulo, Pedrão joined the youth setup of Água Santa at the age of 15. While playing for the 2015 and 2016 editions of the Copa São Paulo de Futebol Júnior, he drew the attention of scouts. In 2016, he was promoted to the senior team and went on to represent the side in Campeonato Paulista. Although he received an offer from Grêmio at the end of the season, nothing materialised.

On 21 February 2017, Pedrão was loaned to Palmeiras for a year and was assigned to the under-20 team. In October, Italian club S.P.A.L. 2013 expressed their desire to sign him although nothing materialised.

In December 2017, Palmeiras announced the signing of Pedrão on a five year deal, although the percentage of rights acquired was not disclosed.

In January 2019, Pedrão was loaned to América Mineiro for a year. On 21 February of the following year, he moved to Athletico Paranaense also in a temporary deal.

On 11 August 2021, he joined Portimonense in Portugal on loan.

Style of play
Although Pedrão started his career as a defender, he switched his position to the midfield because he could attack and score goals. He can also play as a right winger.

References

External links

1997 births
Living people
Footballers from São Paulo
Brazilian footballers
Association football defenders
Esporte Clube Água Santa players
Sociedade Esportiva Palmeiras players
América Futebol Clube (MG) players
Club Athletico Paranaense players
C.D. Nacional players
Campeonato Brasileiro Série B players
Primeira Liga players
Brazilian expatriate footballers
Portimonense S.C. players
Expatriate footballers in Portugal
Brazilian expatriate sportspeople in Portugal